Yogi Bear is a fictional bear who appears in animated cartoons created by Hanna-Barbera Productions.

Yogi Bear may also refer to:

Television animation

Series
The Yogi Bear Show (1961)
Yogi Bear & Friends (1967)
Yogi's Gang (1973)
Yogi's Space Race (1978)
Galaxy Goof-Ups (1978 spin-off from Yogi's Space Race)
Yogi's Treasure Hunt (1985)
The New Yogi Bear Show (1988)
Yo Yogi! (1991)

Television films and specials
Yogi's First Christmas (1980)
Yogi Bear's All Star Comedy Christmas Caper (1982)
Yogi Bear and the Magical Flight of the Spruce Goose (1987)
Yogi the Easter Bear (1994)
Yogi's Great Escape (1987)
Yogi and the Invasion of the Space Bears (1988)

Other
Yogi Bear's Big Break, the original animated short where Yogi made his debut, shown as part of the Huckleberry Hound Show

Theatrical films
Hey There, It's Yogi Bear!, 1964 animated musical comedy film
Yogi Bear (film), 2010 live-action/animated feature film

Video games
Yogi Bear (video game), a 1987 computer game
Adventures of Yogi Bear, a 1994 video game for the Super NES console
Yogi Bear's Gold Rush, a 1994 video game for the Nintendo Game Boy

Albums
Yogi Bear and the Three Stooges Meet the Mad, Mad, Mad Dr. No-No, a 1966 comedy album

See also
List of The Yogi Bear Show episodes
List of Yogi Bear characters
Yogi Bear's Jellystone Park Camp-Resorts

Yogi Berra